Bob Lazarus (January 4, 1956 – January 4, 2009) was an American stand-up comedian and film actor.

Lazarus graduated from the University of Massachusetts Amherst.

He appeared on Showtime and Comedy Central. Lazarus had toured the United States with Steven Wright. He also appeared with Robin Williams, Jay Leno, Rob Schneider, Denis Leary, Judy Tenuta, Sinbad, Paula Poundstone and Ray Romano.

Personal life
Lazarus was married and had a daughter. He lived in Massachusetts when not touring.

Lazarus died of leukemia on January 4, 2009, at Dana-Farber/Brigham towers, on his 53rd birthday.

References

External links
Laugh.com
Bob Lazarus Interview

1956 births
2009 deaths
American stand-up comedians
American male film actors
Deaths from cancer in Massachusetts
Deaths from leukemia
University of Massachusetts Amherst alumni
20th-century American comedians
20th-century American male actors